Elachista aurocristata is a moth of the family Elachistidae. It is found in North America in British Columbia, Montana, Oregon and Washington.

The length of the forewings is 4.8–5.5 mm. The ground colour of the forewings is silky white, with some ochreous scales in the middle of the wing at the fold forming an indistinct spot and another similar spot at two-thirds of the wing. The hindwings are silky light grey and translucent. The underside of the forewings is pale ochreous and the underside of the hindwings is pale grey.

References

Moths described in 1921
aurocristata
Moths of North America